
Year 456 BC was a year of the pre-Julian Roman calendar. At the time, it was known as the Year of the Consulship of Lactuca and Caeliomontanus (or, less frequently, year 298 Ab urbe condita). The denomination 456 BC for this year has been used since the early medieval period, when the Anno Domini calendar era became the prevalent method in Europe for naming years.

Events

By place

Greece 
 The first of the Athenian sculptor Phidias' monuments to Athena, the bronze Athena Promachos, is placed on the Athenian Acropolis, measuring about 9 metres high.
 The temple of Zeus in Olympia is finished.

Births 
 Aristophanes, Greek playwright (d. c. 386 BC)

Deaths 
 Aeschylus, Greek playwright (b. 525 BC)

References